Sakuraeolis is a genus of sea slugs, aeolid nudibranchs, marine gastropod molluscs in the family Facelinidae.

Species
Species within the genus Sakuraeolis include:
 Sakuraeolis enosimensis (Baba, 1930)
 Sakuraeolis gerberina Hirano, 1999
 Sakuraeolis gujaratica Rudman, 1980
 Sakuraeolis japonica (Baba, 1937)
 Sakuraeolis kirembosa Rudman, 1980
 Sakuraeolis nungunoides Rudman, 1980
 Sakuraeolis sakuracea Hirano, 1999
Species brought into synonymy
 Sakuraeolis modesta (Bergh, 1880): synonym of Sakuraeolis japonica (Baba, 1937)

References

Facelinidae